South Korea competed at the 2015 World Aquatics Championships in Kazan, Russia from 24 July to 9 August 2015.

Diving

South Korean divers qualified for the individual spots and the synchronized teams at the World Championships.

Men

Women

Mixed

Swimming

South Korean swimmers have achieved qualifying standards in the following events (up to a maximum of 2 swimmers in each event at the A-standard entry time, and 1 at the B-standard): Swimmers must qualify at the 2015 Dong-A Tournament and KSF National & President's Cup (for pool events) to eclipse the FINA A-cut or national standard record times of each event and to confirm their places for the Worlds.

Men

Women

Synchronized swimming

South Korea has qualified two synchronized swimmers for each of the following events.

References

External links
Korean Swimming Federation 

Nations at the 2015 World Aquatics Championships
2015 in South Korean sport
South Korea at the World Aquatics Championships